Jaimie is an alternative spelling of Jamie or Jaime and may refer to:

People 
 Jaimie Alexander (born 1984), American actress
 Jaimie Cloud, American sustainability educator and advocate
 Jaimie Dawson (born 1969), badminton player from Canada
 Jaimie Leonarder (born 1958), Australian musician, archivist, social worker, film critic, radio announcer, and DJ
 Jaimie Branch (born 1983), trumpeter playing jazz and improvisational music
 Jaimie D'Cruz, British documentary film producer and director
 Jaimie Thibeault (born 1989), Canadian female volleyball player
 Jaimie Leonard (died 2011), lieutenant colonel in the United States Army
 Jaimie McEvoy (born 1965), author, historian, politician, and community activist
 Jaimie Natsuki (born 1992), Japanese actress and tarento
 Jaimie Thomas (born 1986), American football guard
 Jaimie Warren (born 1980), American photographer and performance artist
 Jaimie Mantzel, inventor

Media 
 Jaimie McPheeters, a character from The Travels of Jaimie McPheeters and  its TV series adaptation

See also 
 Jamey

English unisex given names